Christa-Elizabeth Goulakos (born March 3, 1988 in Montreal, Quebec) is a Canadian former competitive ice dancer who represents Greece internationally. She competes with Bradley Yaeger.

In the 2006-2007 season, she competed with Eric Neumann-Aubichon. They represented Greece at the 2007 European Figure Skating Championships and the 2007 World Figure Skating Championships.

References

External links
 

Canadian female ice dancers
1988 births
Figure skaters from Montreal
Living people
Greek female ice dancers